Astrakhan is the largest city and administrative centre of Astrakhan Oblast in Southern Russia. The city lies on two banks of the Volga, in the upper part of the Volga Delta, on eleven islands of the Caspian Depression, 60 miles (100 km) from the Caspian Sea, with a population of 475,629 residents at the 2021 Census.

Astrakhan was formerly the capital of the Khanate of Astrakhan (a remnant of the Golden Horde), and was located on the higher right bank of the Volga, 7 miles (11 km) from the present-day city. Situated on caravan and water routes, it developed from a village into a large trading centre, before being conquered by Timur in 1395 and captured by Ivan the Terrible in 1556. In 1558 it was moved to its present site. 

The oldest economic and cultural center of the Lower Volga, it is often called the southernmost outpost of Russia, and the Caspian capital. The city is a member of the Eurasian Regional Office of the World Organization "United Cities and Local Governments". The great ethnic diversity of its population gives a varied character to Astrakhan. The city is the center of the Astrakhan metropolitan area.

Etymology
The name is a corruption of Hashtarkhan, itself a corruption of Haji Tarkhan—a name amply evidenced in the medieval writings. Tarkhan is possibly a Turco-Mongolian title standing for "great khan", or "king", while haji or hajji is a title given to one who has made the Islamic requisite of pilgrimage to Mecca. Together, they denoted "the king who has visited Mecca".

The city has given its name to the particular pelts from young karakul sheep, and in particular to the hats traditionally made from the pelts.

Colloquially, the city is known by the short form Astra. Another popular nickname is The Caspian Capital.

History

Medieval history

Astrakhan is in the Volga Delta, which is rich in sturgeon and exotic plants. The fertile area formerly contained the capitals of Khazaria and the Golden Horde. Astrakhan was first mentioned by travelers in the early 13th century as Xacitarxan. Tamerlane burnt it to the ground in 1395 during his war with the Golden Horde. From 1459 to 1556, Xacitarxan was the capital of Astrakhan Khanate. The ruins of this medieval settlement were found by archaeologists 12 km upstream from the modern-day city.

Starting in A.D. 1324, Ibn Battuta, the famous Berber Muslim traveler, began his pilgrimage from his native city of Tangier, present-day Morocco to Mecca. Along the  trek, which took nearly 29 years, Battuta came in contact with many new cultures, which he writes about in his diaries. One specific country that he passed through on his journey was the Golden Horde ruled by the descendants of Genghis Khan, located on the Volga River in southern Russia; which Battuta refers to as the river Athal. He then claims the Athal is, "one of the greatest rivers in the world". In the winter, the Khan stays in Astrakhan. Due to the cold water, Özbeg Khan ordered the people of Astrakhan to lay many bundles of hay down on the frozen river. He does this to allow the people to travel over the ice. When Battuta and the Khan spoke about Battuta visiting Constantinople, which the Khan granted him permission to do, the Khan then gifted Battuta with fifteen hundred dinars, many horses, and a dress of honor.

In 1556, the khanate was conquered by Ivan the Terrible, who had a new fortress, or kremlin, built on a steep hill overlooking the Volga in 1558. This year is traditionally considered to be the foundation of the modern city.

In 1569, during the Russo-Turkish War, Astrakhan was besieged by the Ottomans, who had to retreat in disarray. A year later, the Ottoman sultan renounced his claims to Astrakhan, thus opening the entire Volga River to Russian traffic. The Ottoman Empire, though militarily defeated, insisted on safe passage for Muslim pilgrims and traders from Central Asia as well as the destruction of the Russian fort on the Terek River. In the 17th century, the city was developed as a Russian gate to the Orient. Many merchants from Armenia, Safavid Persia, Mughal India, and Khivan Khanate settled in the town, giving it a cosmopolitan character.

Modern history

For seventeen months in 1670–1671, Astrakhan was held by Stenka Razin and his Cossacks. Early in the following century, Peter the Great constructed a shipyard here and made Astrakhan the base for his hostilities against Persia, and later in the same century Catherine the Great accorded the city important industrial privileges.

The city rebelled against the Tsar once again in 1705, when it was held by the Cossacks under Kondraty Bulavin. A Kalmuck khan laid an abortive siege to the kremlin several years before that.

In 1711, it became the seat of a governorate, whose first governors included Artemy Petrovich Volynsky and Vasily Nikitich Tatishchev. Six years later, Astrakhan served as a base for the first Russian venture into Central Asia. In 1702, 1718 and 1767, it suffered severely from fires; in 1719 it was plundered by the Safavid Persians; and in 1830, cholera killed much of the populace.

Astrakhan's kremlin was built from the 1580s to the 1620s from bricks taken from the site of Sarai Berke. Its two impressive cathedrals were consecrated in 1700 and 1710, respectively. Built by masters from Yaroslavl, they retain many traditional features of Russian church architecture, while their exterior decoration is definitely baroque.

In March 1919 after a failed workers' revolt against Bolshevik rule, 3,000 to 5,000 people were executed in less than a week by the Cheka under orders from Sergey Kirov. Some victims had stones tied around their necks and were thrown into the Volga.

During Operation Barbarossa, the German invasion of the Soviet Union in 1941, the A-A line running from Astrakhan to Arkhangelsk was to be the eastern limit of German military operation and occupation. The plan was never carried out, as Germany captured neither the two cities nor Moscow. In the autumn of 1942, the region to the west of Astrakhan became one of the easternmost points in the Soviet Union reached by the invading German Wehrmacht, during Case Blue, the offensive which led to the Battle of Stalingrad. Light armored forces of German Army Group A made brief scouting missions as close as 35 km to Astrakhan before withdrawing. In the same period, elements of both the Luftwaffe's KG 4 and KG 100 bomber wings attacked Astrakhan, flying several air raids and bombing the city's oil terminals and harbor installations.

In 1943, Astrakhan was made the seat of a Soviet oblast within the RSFSR. The oblast was retained as a national province of the independent Russian Federation in the 1991 administrative reshuffle after the dismemberment of the Soviet Union.

In the present day, Astrakhan is a large industrial centre of the Volga country, Russia, with a population of 100,000. Starting nearly 400 years ago and continuing to the present day, Astrakhan has been Russia's main center of fish processing. The market for fish is a large component of the economy in this city.

Owing to shared Caspian borders, Astrakhan recently has been playing a significant role in the relations between Russia and Azerbaijan. As the latter's government has been heavily investing into the wellbeing of the city, Astrakhan has recently begun to symbolize the friendship between both countries. In 2010 a bridge was constructed with donations from Azerbaijan, which was named "Bridge of Friendship". Moreover, Azerbaijani government sponsored secondary school number 11, which carries the name of the national leader Heydar Aliyev, as well as a children's entertainment center named "Dream". Apart from that, a park has been built in the center of Astrakhan which is dedicated to friendship between the two countries. In the last 5 years Astrakhan has been visited by top Azerbaijani delegations on several occasions.

After fraud was alleged in the mayoral election of 2012 and the United Russia candidate was declared the winner, organizers of the 2011–2012 Russian protests supported the defeated candidate, Oleg V. Shein of Just Russia, in a hunger strike. Protestors, buoyed by celebrities who support the reform movement, attracted 5,000 people to a rally on April 14.

Administrative and municipal status
Astrakhan is the administrative center of the oblast. Within the framework of administrative divisions, it is incorporated as the city of oblast significance of Astrakhan—an administrative unit with the status equal to that of the districts. As a municipal division, the city of oblast significance of Astrakhan is incorporated as Astrakhan Urban Okrug.

The city of Astrakhan is further subdivided into four administrative districts: Kirovsky, Leninsky, Sovetsky and Truskovsky.

Demographics

Religion

Astrakhan is the archiepiscopal see of one of the metropolitanates and (as Astrakhan and Yenotayevka) eparchies of the Russian Orthodox Church, its only other suffragan being Akhtubinsk. There is also a Catholic community, served by the Church of the Assumption of Mary (Astrakhan).

Population
According to the results of the 2010 Census, the population of Astrakhan was 520,339.

At the time of the official 2010 Census, the ethnic makeup of the city's population was:

Climate
Astrakhan features a temperate continental "Aralian" semi-arid climate (Köppen climate classification: BSk) with cold winters and hot summers. Astrakhan is one of the driest cities in Europe. Rainfall is scarce but relatively evenly distributed throughout the course of the year with, however, more precipitation (58%) in the hot season (six hottest months of the year), which determines the "Aralian" type (as opposed to the "Turkmenon" type, with the wet season during the cold months). The below sea-level elevation of Astrakhan influences the climate. Partially a result of this and also being far from the oceans means that summers are much hotter than found further west on similar latitude in Europe and worldwide for 46°N with the notable exception of the interior Pacific Northwest of the United States.

It is this even distribution of rainfall and the relatively low annual temperature that causes the city to fall under this climate category as opposed to an arid climate.

Winters tend to be cold in the city, though by Russian standards, Astrakhan features relatively balmy winters. Spring and fall are basically transitional seasons between summer and winter.

Education
Astrakhan has five institutions of higher education. Most prominent among these are Astrakhan State Technical University and Astrakhan State University.

Transportation

The city is served by Narimanovo Airport named after Soviet Azerbaijani politician Nariman Narimanov. It is managed by OAO Aeroport Astrakhan. After its reconstruction and the building of the international sector, opened in February 2011, Narimanovo Airport is one of the most modern regional airports in Russia. There are direct flights between Astrakhan and Aktau, Istanbul, St. Petersburg and Moscow.

There is also an military airbase nearby (Astrakhan (air base)). 

Astrakhan is linked by rail to the north (Volgograd and Moscow), the east (Atyrau and Kazakhstan) and the south (Makhachkala and Baku). There are direct trains to Moscow, Volgograd, Saint Petersburg, Baku, Kyiv, Brest and other towns. Intercity and international buses are available as well. Public local transport is mainly provided by buses and minibuses called marshrutkas. Until 2007 there were also trams, and until 2017 trolleybuses.

People

Boris Kustodiev, painter
Joseph Deniker, naturalist and anthropologist
Ilya Ulyanov, father of Aleksandr Ulyanov and Vladimir Lenin.
Rinat Dasayev, association football player
Marziyya Davudova, actress
Velimir Khlebnikov, poet
Emiliya Turey, handball player
Andrei Belyanin, science fiction writer
Dmitri Dyuzhev, actor
Maksim Gleykin, former professional football player
Vasily Trediakovsky, academic, poet, translator
Tamara Milashkina, soprano
Valeria Barsova, soprano
Maria Maksakova, Sr., mezzo-soprano
Elena Nikitina, skeleton racer
Yelena Shalamova, rhythmic gymnast
Natalia Sokolovskaya, pianist and composer

Twin towns and sister cities

Astrakhan is twinned with:
 Sari, Mazandaran Province, Iran
 Rasht, Gilan Province, Iran 
 Ahmedabad, Gujarat, India
 Fort Lauderdale, United States
 Atyrau, Kazakhstan
 Brest, Belarus
 Grand-Popo, Benin
 Pembroke Pines, United States
 Ljubljana, Slovenia
 Islamabad, Pakistan

See also
Astrakhan Jews
Astrakhan Tatars

References

Sources

External links

Official website of Astrakhan 
Directory of organizations in Astrakhan 
Old photos of Astrakhan

 
Astrakhan Governorate
Populated places on the Volga
Russian and Soviet Navy bases
Populated places established in 1558